The 7th constituency of Oise is a French legislative constituency in the Oise département.

Description

The 7th constituency of the Oise lies in the centre of the department.

From 2002 to 2017 the seat was represented by Édouard Courtial of the conservative UMP. At the 2012 election he defeated the Regional President Claude Gewerc in the second round in order to hold the seat.

Historic Representation

Election results

2022 

 
 
 
 
|-
| colspan="8" bgcolor="#E9E9E9"|
|-

2017

2012

 
 
 
 
|-
| colspan="8" bgcolor="#E9E9E9"|
|-

Sources
Official results of French elections from 2002: "Résultats électoraux officiels en France" (in French).

7